Nagpur Mahanagar Parivahan Limited is a special purpose vehicle of the Nagpur Municipal Corporation to run transport services within Nagpur city.

Operations 
In 2007, the Nagpur Municipal Corporation signed an agreement with a private party to purchase the buses and operate them under a 'Purchase-Operate-Transfer' model and pay the corporation a fixed royalty per bus. The corporation was also to earn back 50% of its revenue from advertisements on buses.

In 2013, it was announced that the Government of India would fund the corporations plans of building a new bus station at Mor Bhavan and a depot at Dhaba along with the provision of purchasing more buses.

Fleet 

As of now it has a fleet of 437 buses. They run in and around city and suburbs. In 2014, Swedish bus manufacturer Scania AB announced that it would hand over the first ethanol-powered city bus made in India to the Nagpur Municipal Corporation on the recommendation of Nitin Gadkari, Union Minister for Transport, for trial runs. The Ministry requested clearance from the Automotive Research Association of India (ARAI) in order to amend the Motor Vehicles Act of 1988 to legally recognise ethanol as a commercial fuel type.

References 

Municipal transport agencies of India
Transport in Nagpur
2010 establishments in Maharashtra
Indian companies established in 2010
Transport companies established in 2010
Companies based in Maharashtra
Government agencies established in 2010